Valerianos is a village and a community in the island of Cephalonia, Greece.  In 2011 its population was 154 for the village, and 302 for the community, which includes the villages Atsoupades (pop. 97) and Plateies (pop. 51). It is situated at the southeastern foot of Mount Ainos, at about 190 m elevation. It is 0.5 km northwest of Chionata, 3 km southwest of Pastra, 9 km southwest of Poros and 23 km southeast of Argostoli. Valerianos was devastated by the 1953 Ionian earthquake.

Population

Notable people 
Juan de Fuca (1536–1602), Greek maritime pilot in the service of the Spanish king Philip II

See also

List of settlements in Cephalonia

External links
Valerianos at the GTP Travel Pages

References

Populated places in Cephalonia
Eleios-Pronnoi